The  opened in then Kahoku, now Kami, Kōchi Prefecture, Japan in 2003. It is dedicated to the life and works of poet Yoshii Isamu. In the grounds lies the Keiki-sō, his retreat of 1934, restored in 1964 and relocated to this site in 2006, a registered Tangible Cultural Property.

See also
Yanase Takashi Memorial Hall
 Kōchi Literary Museum
Minka

References

External links

  Yoshii Isamu Memorial Museum

Museums in Kōchi Prefecture
Biographical museums in Japan
Literary museums in Japan
Museums established in 2003
2003 establishments in Japan
Kami, Kōchi